Oiva Timonen (26 May 1920 – 31 October 1998) was a Finnish wrestler. He competed in the men's freestyle flyweight at the 1952 Summer Olympics.

References

External links
 

1920 births
1998 deaths
People from Evijärvi
Finnish male sport wrestlers
Olympic wrestlers of Finland
Wrestlers at the 1952 Summer Olympics
Sportspeople from South Ostrobothnia